Ahmed Magdy (born 4 May 1986) is an Egyptian-Algerian actor, artist and director.

Early life
Magdy was born in Cairo, Egypt, in 1986, to an Egyptian father, film director Ahmed Ali, and an Algerian mother. He grew up and lived in Cairo, Egypt and In September 2018, he married Noha Khattab, an Egyptian.

Magdy graduated from the law faculty at Ain Shams University, in Cairo, and then joined the El-Tamy Theater troupe and worked as an actor, assistant director and trainer.

Career
His first film was the independent six-minute 2007 Egyptian documentary work "Magra El-Ceil" ("Riverbed"). He then took part in a workshop inhospitable native Cairo entitled "El-Zatt wa El-Madina, El-Qahira" ("The Self and the City - Cairo") which was produced by both the European Union and Egypt's El-Sammat Production Company, which involved the production of another Egyptian  documentary called "Zeezo". After joining the Cairo Jesuit Cinema School he directed three low budget short titles. His graduation project, "Keika Sagheera" (كيكة صغيرة , "Small Cake"), received an honor from the judging committee at the Algeria Independent Cinema Festival.

Overall, Magdy has taken part in more than 30 independent works. He has directed "Ella El-Bah" ("To the Sea…"), which was produced by the Forced Migration and Refugee Studies department at the American University in Cairo. He has also acted in "’Asafeer El-Neel"  , "Birds of the Nile") which is an adaptation of the novel by renowned writer Ibrahim Aslan.

Filmography

Films

Television

Personal life
Madgy enjoys photography and can also play numerous instruments. He also practices contemporary dance.

In 2018, Magdy married an Egyptian woman, his wedding was in a prestigious place in his hometown Cairo.

References

External links
 

1986 births
Male actors from Cairo
Ain Shams University alumni
The American University in Cairo
Film directors from Cairo
Egyptian male actors
Egyptian male film actors
Egyptian male television actors
Algerian male film actors
Algerian male television actors
Egyptian people of Algerian descent
Living people